Bonds Creek is a stream in the U.S. state of West Virginia.

Bonds Creek was named in honor of Lewis Bond.

See also
List of rivers of West Virginia

References

Rivers of Ritchie County, West Virginia
Rivers of West Virginia